Rapmasters: From Tha Priority Vaults, Vol. 4 is the fourth volume of an eight volume budget compilation series released by Priority Records throughout 1996 and 1997. Like the previous volume, This volume was issued in a fully uncut explicit version [as well as an edited version]. On the edited version, Ice Cube's The Wrong Nigga To Fuck Wit is replaced with Ice Cube's Amerikkka's Most Wanted.

Track listing
 The Wrong Nigga To Fuck Wit (Ice Cube)
 Mozi-Wozi (Mack 10)
 Funky Song (Low Profile)
 Out On a Furlough (WC and the Maad Circle)
 8 Ball (N.W.A)
 Living In The Ghetto (KMC)
 One Time Fo' Ya Mind (Paris)
 Jane (EPMD)
 Behind The Scenes (MC Ren)

References

1996 compilation albums
Priority Records compilation albums
Gangsta rap compilation albums
Hip hop compilation albums
Record label compilation albums